Mamadou Diallo (born 31 October 1997) is a Guinean professional footballer.

References

External links 
 
 

1997 births
Living people
Guinean footballers
Guinean expatriate footballers
Expatriate footballers in Belarus
Expatriate footballers in Kazakhstan
Association football forwards
FC Energetik-BGU Minsk players
FC Kaisar players